The Young Socialists in the PvdA (JS) is a Dutch social-democratic youth organisation. The JS is a politically independent organisation, but is affiliated with the Labour Party (PvdA). Members must be between 12 and 28 years old. Members are not required to be a member of the Labour Party.

JS used to be a democratic socialist organisation that promotes the full participation of young people in society. Since 2007 however, the JS has adapted social democracy as their ideology, calling for "a peaceful and just world with happy and committed people."

The JS has a very diverse and active memberbase and is entirely run by young people. They organise trainings on different topics ranging from intercultural learning, European integration, human rights, theater, etc. They have debates, public awareness campaigns and excursions and also publish their own magazine, called LAVA.
 
JS is a member organisation of International Union of Socialist Youth and Young European Socialists.

List of Chairpersons 
 2020–present: Andrej van Hout
 2019-2020: Luna Koops
 2018-2019: Twan Wilmes
 2016-2018: Lieke Kuiper
 2014-2016: Bart van Bruggen
 2012-2014: Toon Geenen
 2011-2012: Rick Jonker
 2010-2011: Jelle Menges
 2009-2010: Mohammed Mohandis
 2008-2009: Sven Stevenson
 2007-2008: Michiel Emmelkamp
 2006-2007: Peter Scheffer
 2005-2006: Ruben Zandvliet
 2004-2005: Remy Wilshaus
 2003-2004: Loes Ypma
 2002-2003: Servaz van Berkum
 2001-2002: Jasper Fastl
 2000-2001: Sander Zboray
 1999-2000: Eddy Bekkers
 1997-1999: Omar Ramadan 
 1996-1997: Fanny Bod
 1994-1996: Tjeerd van Dekken
 1992-1994: Sharon Dijksma
 1990-1992: Mark de Koning
 1988-1990: Marcel Hoogland
 1986-1988: Erwino Ouwerkerk
 1983-1986: Michiel Zonneveld
 1982-1983: Margo Vliegenthart
 1979-1982: Rob van Gijzel
 1977-1979: Felix Rottenberg

References

External links
 Official homepage of JS 

Youth wings of political parties in the Netherlands
Youth wings of social democratic parties
Labour Party (Netherlands)